Sandra Giancola (born 4 July 1965) is an Argentine fencer. She competed in the women's individual and team foil events at the 1984 Summer Olympics and the individual foil at the 1992 Summer Olympics. She is the sister of Silvana Giancola, who also fenced at the Olympics for Argentina.

References

External links
 

1965 births
Living people
Argentine female foil fencers
Olympic fencers of Argentina
Fencers at the 1984 Summer Olympics
Fencers at the 1992 Summer Olympics
Pan American Games medalists in fencing
Pan American Games silver medalists for Argentina
Pan American Games bronze medalists for Argentina
Fencers at the 1991 Pan American Games
Medalists at the 1991 Pan American Games
20th-century Argentine women